Robert Moses State Park - Thousand Islands is a  state park located on Barnhart Island in the Saint Lawrence River and the adjacent mainland in the Town of Massena in St. Lawrence County, New York. The park is north of the Village of Massena, near the Canada–US border.

The park is named after former New York Parks Commissioner Robert Moses, who created many of the state parks in New York. It is one of two state parks in New York to bear his name. The other, Robert Moses State Park - Long Island, is in southern New York on Fire Island.

Park description
Robert Moses State Park offers a beach, picnic tables with pavilions, a playground, recreation programs, a nature trail, hiking trails through woods and wetlands, fishing, a boat launch and marina, a campground with tent and trailer sites, cabins, cross-country skiing and snowmobiling, and a food concession.

Visitors may access the portion of the park on Barnhart Island by traveling through a tunnel below the Eisenhower Locks, part of the Saint Lawrence Seaway.

A nature center offers outdoor education opportunities, and is managed by the Friends of the Robert Moses State Park Nature Center, Inc. As of 2015, the nature center is operating out of facilities at the St. Lawrence Center Mall while construction is completed on a new building at park. The new facility, financed by the New York Power Authority, will replace the former nature center that was destroyed in a March 2010 fire.

A sign near the entrance of the park notes the location where the 45th parallel crosses through the park.

See also
 List of New York state parks
 List of nature centers in New York

References

External links
 New York State Parks: Robert Moses State Park - Thousand Islands
 New York State Parks: Robert Moses State Park - Thousand Islands trail map
 New York State Parks: Robert Moses State Park - Thousand Islands Nature Center
 Friends of the Robert Moses State Park Nature Center

State parks of New York (state)
Robert Moses projects
Thousand Islands
Nature centers in New York (state)
Parks in St. Lawrence County, New York